HMCS Chebogue was a River-class frigate that served with the Royal Canadian Navy during the Second World War. She served primarily as an ocean convoy escort in the Battle of the Atlantic. She was named for Chebogue, Nova Scotia. During the war she was torpedoed and declared a constructive loss.

Chebogue was ordered in June 1942 as part of the 1942–1943 River-class building program. She was laid down on 19 March 1943 by Yarrows Ltd. at Esquimalt and launched 17 August 1943. She was commissioned into the Royal Canadian Navy on 22 February 1943 at Esquimalt.

Background

The River-class frigate was designed by William Reed of Smith's Dock Company of South Bank-on-Tees. Originally called a "twin-screw corvette", its purpose was to improve on the convoy escort classes in service with the Royal Navy at the time, including the Flower-class corvette. The first orders were placed by the Royal Navy in 1940 and the vessels were named for rivers in the United Kingdom, giving name to the class. In Canada they were named for towns and cities though they kept the same designation. The name "frigate" was suggested by Vice-Admiral Percy Nelles of the Royal Canadian Navy and was adopted later that year.

Improvements over the corvette design included improved accommodation which was markedly better. For underwater targets, the River-class frigate was equipped with a Hedgehog anti-submarine mortar and depth charge rails aft and four side-mounted throwers.

River-class frigates were the first Royal Canadian Navy warships to carry the 147B Sword horizontal fan echo sonar transmitter in addition to the irregular ASDIC. This allowed the ship to maintain contact with targets even while firing unless a target was struck. Improved radar and direction-finding equipment improved the RCN's ability to find and track enemy submarines over the previous classes.

Canada originally ordered the construction of 33 frigates in October 1941. The design was too big for the shipyards on the Great Lakes so all the frigates built in Canada were built in dockyards along the west coast or along the St. Lawrence River. In all Canada ordered the construction of 60 frigates including ten for the Royal Navy that transferred two to the United States Navy.

War service
After transiting to Halifax and arriving on 12 April 1944, Chebogue was sent to work up at Bermuda. Upon her return in May, she was assigned to the Mid-Ocean Escort Force escort group C-1 as a trans-Atlantic convoy escort. On her second return trip to Canada with a convoy she was torpedoed.

Torpedoing
GNAT was the codename (German Naval Acoustic Torpedo) the Allies gave to the torpedo that tracked targets by the sounds they made. With part of her stern missing, Chebogue was unable to move under her own steam and had to be taken under tow. The RNLI lifeboat Edward, Prince of Wales was despatched to aid in the rescue of the ship's crew. For recovering the crew of Chebogue Coxswain William Gammon was awarded the Gold Medal for Gallantry, with Second Coxswain Tom Ace and Mechanic Gilbert Davies receiving the Bronze Medal.

Chebogue was re-floated and taken to Port Talbot where she was declared a constructive loss. Chebogue was placed in reserve at Port Talbot until December when she was towed to Newport, Wales where it was intended to make her seaworthy enough to be towed across the Atlantic Ocean. That plan was cancelled and Chebogue was instead taken to Milford Haven and paid off 25 September 1945. She was broken up in 1948.

References
Notes

References
Macpherson, Ken; Burgess, John. The ships of Canada's naval forces 1910–1981 : a complete pictorial history of Canadian warships. Collins: Toronto, 1981.

External links
 Canadian War Museum – Torpedo damage to Chebogue

River-class frigates of the Royal Canadian Navy
1943 ships
Maritime incidents in October 1944